Uncover is a Canadian investigative journalism podcast, launched in 2018 by the Canadian Broadcasting Corporation. Each season is hosted by a different journalist, and delves into Canadian and international crime stories.

The second season, Bomb on Board, won the RTNDA Canada award for Best Original / Enterprise Journalism in 2019. In August 2019, the CBC announced that the third season, The Village, was in development as the basis for a documentary television series.

As with other CBC podcasts, episodes of the series have aired terrestrially on CBC Radio One as substitute programming in the summer season and on public holidays.

Seasons

References

2018 podcast debuts
Crime podcasts
CBC Radio One programs
Canadian podcasts
Audio podcasts
Documentary podcasts